Maiden Castle is an Iron Age promontory fort in Durham, England. It is listed as a scheduled monument.

Location

The Victoria County History describes the location of the fort as follows:

An earlier description gives more detail:

Although the river Wear now touches the site only on one side, the local topography suggests that the site may have been chosen because, at that time, the river enclosed it on three sides, the river having since adopted a more easterly course across its floodplain.

Structure

Although the entire site has been overgrown with trees for over a century, there are remains of earthworks at the western end.

Here, where the land is level, a bank and outer ditch were constructed, enclosing a wedge-shaped area which is 120 metres wide at the western end, narrowing to 50 m at the eastern end, and extending 145 m from east to west.

The bank is about 6 m wide and 5 m high. The ditch, which is located rather more than 20 m west of the bank, has a maximum depth of about 2 m.

It is not certain where the entrance to the fort was located. It may have been at the northern end, where there is a gap in the ditch, or at the extreme southern end, but the area has been disturbed by landscaping, making interpretation difficult.

Only limited excavation has been carried out on the site, but there is some evidence that the interior of the bank was strengthened with a stone wall; the excavation unearthed at least one stone bearing a stonemason's mark, which dates the work to the Middle Ages.

Origin of the name

The name "maiden" probably means a "fortification that looks impregnable" or one that has never been taken in battle. Alternatively, Maiden Castle comes from the Brythonic *moe din meaning 'grassy plain'.

References

Buildings and structures in Durham, England
Scheduled monuments in County Durham